The 1969 Washington Huskies football team was an American football team that represented the University of Washington during the 1969 NCAA University Division football season.  In its thirteenth season under head coach Jim Owens, the team compiled a 1–9 record (1–6 in the Pacific-8 Conference, seventh), and was outscored 304 to 116.

Winless entering the Apple Cup, the Huskies defeated Washington State in Seattle to avoid the conference cellar.

Senior guard Ken Ballenger and defensive tackle Lee Brock were the team captains.

Schedule

Game summaries

Washington State
Both teams entered the Apple Cup winless in the Pac-8.

Roster

NFL Draft selections
Two University of Washington Huskies were selected in the 1970 NFL Draft, which lasted seventeen rounds with 442 selections.

References

Washington
Washington Huskies football seasons
Washington Huskies football